The 1998 Premier League speedway season was the second division of speedway in the United Kingdom and governed by the Speedway Control Board (SCB), in conjunction with the British Speedway Promoters' Association (BSPA).

Season summary
The League consisted of 13 teams for the 1998 season with the following the closure of the Long Eaton Invaders and the decision of the Oxford Cheetahs to compete in the Elite League. The addition of the Peterborough Panthers who dropped down from the Elite League limited the reduction in numbers.  

The League was run on a standard format with no play-offs and was won by Peterborough.

Final table

Premier League Knockout Cup
The 1998 Premier League Knockout Cup was the 31st edition of the Knockout Cup for tier two teams. Reading Racers were the winners of the competition.

Northern Group

Southern Group

Semi-finals

Final
First leg

Second leg

Reading were declared Knockout Cup Champions, winning on aggregate 103–77.

Leading averages

Riders & final averages
Arena Essex 

Leigh Lanham 9.03
Jan Pedersen 8.71
Colin White 7.90
Troy Pratt 6.96
David Mason 4.69
Matt Read 4.00
Paul Lydes-Uings 2.60
Nathan Morton 2.52
Anthony Barlow 2.27
Oliver Allen 2.26
Gavin Hedge 2.07

Berwick

Rene Madsen 8.45
Scott Lamb 8.22
James Grieves 8.00
David Walsh 7.47
Peter Scully 6.77
Jörg Pingel 6.46
Scott Robson 6.45
Martin Dixon 6.31
David Meldrum 5.25
Craig Taylor 4.68
David McAllan 2.99
Wesley Waite 2.74

Edinburgh

Peter Carr 9.26
Kenny McKinna 8.66
Kevin Little 7.95
Marcus Andersson 5.63
Robert Larsen 5.49
Barry Campbell 5.33
Paul Gould 4.76
Blair Scott 4.37

Exeter

Frank Smart 9.03
Michael Coles 8.38 
Peter Jeffery 7.90
Mark Simmonds 7.71
Graeme Gordon 6.54
Roger Lobb 4.83
Gary Lobb 4.31
Paul Oughton 4.26
Chris Courage 2.43

Glasgow

Mick Powell 9.32 
Kaj Laukkanen 8.93
David Steen 7.53
Grant MacDonald 6.67
Daniel Andersson 6.17
Sean Courtney 5.68
Will Beveridge 5.56
Brian Turner 4.81

Hull

Paul Thorp 9.56 
Paul Bentley 8.93 
Alan Grahame 6.67
Lee Dicken 6.54 
Paul Lee 5.28
John Wilson 4.69 
Simon Cartwright 2.92

Isle of Wight

Ray Morton 8.40
Philippe Berge 8.29
Steve Masters 8.21
Jason Bunyan 7.21
Neville Tatum 7.15
Scott Swain 7.14
Wayne Carter 6.59
Danny Bird  3.60
Anthony Barlow 3.59

Newcastle

Nicki Pedersen 9.97
Brent Werner 8.26 
Jesper Olsen 8.17 
Stuart Swales 6.96
James Birkinshaw 3.77
Jonathan Swales 3.13
David McAllan 2.84
Malcolm Hogg 0.95

Newport

Craig Watson 8.36
Paul Fry 8.00
Anders Henriksson 7.52 
Scott Pegler 5.82
Martin Willis 4.93
David Mason 4.60
Jon Armstrong. 3.40
Chris Neath 3.29

Peterborough

Glenn Cunningham 9.55
Jan Andersen 9.29
Nigel Sadler 8.20
Philippe Bergé 7.83
David Howe 7.79
Brett Woodifield 7.01
Simon Stead 5.46
Paul Clews 4.84
Oliver Allen 4.04
Ross Brady 1.90

Reading

Lee Richardson 9.60
Dave Mullett 9.48 
Petri Kokko 9.36 
Phil Morris 5.15
Krister Marsh 4.67
Justin Elkins 4.61
Paul Clews 4.04
Lee Driver 2.70

Sheffield

Carl Stonehewer 9.93
Scott Smith 7.23
Rene Aas 6.65
Andre Compton 6.44
Steve Knott 5.58
Tommy Palmer 5.13
Derrol Keats 5.10

Stoke

Paul Pickering 9.00
Neil Collins 7.37
Mark Burrows 5.78
Craig Taylor 5.03
Stewart McDonald 4.63
Dean Felton 4.39
Rob Clarence 2.07

See also
List of United Kingdom Speedway League Champions
Knockout Cup (speedway)

References

Speedway Premier League
Premier
Speedway